Clarence Walter Wakshinski (born April 14, 1936) was a Canadian professional hockey player who played 600 games in the Eastern Hockey League for the Johnstown Jets, New York Rovers, Jersey Larks, Knoxville Knights, Long Island Ducks and Charlotte Checkers.

External links
 

1936 births
Living people
Ice hockey people from Manitoba
Johnstown Jets players
New York Rovers players
Jersey Larks players
Long Island Ducks (ice hockey) players
Charlotte Checkers (EHL) players
Canadian expatriate ice hockey players in the United States
Canadian ice hockey centres